Eve Planeix (born 20 December 2000) is a French synchronized swimmer. She represented France at the 2017 World Aquatics Championships in Budapest, Hungary and at the 2019 World Aquatics Championships in Gwangju, South Korea. At the 2019 World Aquatics Championships she finished in 9th place in the solo free routine. She also competed in the solo free routine at the 2022 World Aquatics Championships held in Budapest, Hungary.

References 

Living people
2000 births
Place of birth missing (living people)
French synchronized swimmers
Synchronized swimmers at the 2017 World Aquatics Championships
Artistic swimmers at the 2019 World Aquatics Championships
Artistic swimmers at the 2022 World Aquatics Championships
European Aquatics Championships medalists in synchronised swimming
21st-century French women
Sportspeople from Clermont-Ferrand